Chester Dewey School No. 14 is a historic school building located at Rochester in Monroe County, New York. It was constructed in 1915-1916 and is a two-story, brown brick structure. The eclectic design freely combines elements and details inspired by the Italian Renaissance, including its eleven bay loggia.

It was listed on the National Register of Historic Places in 1985.

Gallery

See also
 National Register of Historic Places listings in Rochester, New York

References

Educational buildings in Rochester, New York
School buildings on the National Register of Historic Places in New York (state)
Renaissance Revival architecture in New York (state)
School buildings completed in 1916
National Register of Historic Places in Rochester, New York
1916 establishments in New York (state)